Ysgyryd Fawr is an easterly outlier of the Black Mountains in Wales, and forms the easternmost part of the Brecon Beacons National Park.  The hill is often referred to locally as just The Skirrid. The smaller hill of Ysgyryd Fach or "Little Skirrid" (270m) lies about 4.5 km / 2.5 mi to the south.

It is 486 m or 1594 feet high and lies just to the north-east of Abergavenny, Monmouthshire, about 10 miles from the English border. The Beacons Way passes along the ridge.

Geology 

The distinctive shape of this Old Red Sandstone hill comprises a long ridge oriented nearly north–south, with a jagged western side resulting from ice age landslips . The upper slopes of the hill are composed of Devonian age sandstones assigned to the Senni Formation (formerly known as the "Senni Beds").  These overlie weaker mudstones of the St Maughans Formation - a situation which has contributed to the instability of the hill's steep flanks, resulting in a very large landslip at the northern end of the mountain, although the British Geological Survey map of the area (Abergavenny sheet) shows the landslide extending along the whole of the west side of the mountain. There are numerous other landslips of a similar nature on the nearby hills, although that on the Skirrid is perhaps the most well known owing to its visibility from several directions. Some of the landslipped areas contain numerous jumbled blocks of sandstone, one of which is known as the "Devil's Table". The ridge is very similar in its rocky edge to that found on the Black Hill to the north in Herefordshire.

Cultural associations 
The Welsh name Ysgyryd meaning 'split' or 'shattered' and Fawr meaning 'great' describes the hill's shape. There is a rich mythology attached to the mountain , including a distinctive stone known as the Devil's Table. According to legend, part of the mountain is said to have been broken off at the moment of the crucifixion of Jesus. There was a local tradition that earth from the Skirrid was holy and especially fertile, and it was taken away to be scattered on fields elsewhere, on coffins, and in the foundations of churches.  Pilgrimages were made, especially on Michaelmas Eve, to the summit.

History 

In older literature the spelling Skyrrid is sometimes encountered and the mountain is also referred to locally as the Holy Mountain or Sacred Hill. The ruins of an Iron Age hill fort and a mediæval chapel, dedicated to St. Michael, lie at the summit. 
Rudolf Hess used to walk here when he was held prisoner at nearby Maindiff Court during the early 1940s.  North of the mountain at Llanvihangel Crucorney, The Skirrid Mountain Inn  claims to be one of the oldest pubs in Wales.

Ownership and access 
Ysgyryd Fawr has belonged to the National Trust since 1939. The summit offers views of the Sugar Loaf to the west, and Blorenge to the south, and the ridge is easily accessed on foot from the car park beside the B4521 Ross Road shown on the Ordnance Survey maps. The ascent is steep initially through woods, but gradual thereafter as open ground is reached, and a fine walk along the spine of the mountain to the highest point at the north end of the mountain at the trig point and chapel; allow two hours for the completion and return in good weather.  A rough path follows the perimeter of the hill at a much lower level, and can be used as a circular route.

References

External links 

 images of Ysgyryd Fawr and surrounding area on Geograph website
 The Skirrid, on the National Trust website

Marilyns of Wales
Black Mountains, Wales
Mountains and hills of Monmouthshire
Scheduled monuments in Monmouthshire
Abergavenny
National Trust properties in Wales